The Flip Is Another Honey is a studio album by Mike Doughty composed of covers of songs by John Denver, Cheap Trick, Stephen Sondheim, Thin Lizzy, Camille, and others intermingled with his own original music.

Track listing

References 

2012 albums
Mike Doughty albums
ATO Records albums